Ko Tarutao island is the largest island of Tarutao National Marine Park in Satun Province of southern Thailand. It is one of the most unspoiled islands in Andaman Sea and in all of Thailand. The Malay word tertua or tarutao means old and primitive.

Overview 

Most of the island territory is covered in dense, old growth jungle. Mangrove trees and limestone cliffs cover much of the island shores. The western coast has long and wide white-sand beaches which are historical nestling ground sites for turtles. Langurs, crab-eating macaques and wild pigs are common on the island.

From its eastern side the larger island of Ko Tarutao is encircled by over 10 smaller offshore islands and limestone karst islets, such as Ko Sing, Ko Kaman, Ko Ko Lo, Ko Klang, Ko Pulao Na, Ko Daeng, Ko Laen, Ko Lek, and others.

History 

Ko Tarutao is a place of historical importance. Between 1938 and 1948, more than 3000 Thai criminals and political prisoners were held here, including Prince Sithiporn Kridakara a member of Chakri dynasty who would later served as Minister of Agriculture  of post-war Thailand under the third premiership of Khuang Aphaiwong. During World War II, food and medical supplies from the mainland were depleted and many prisoners died from malaria. Those who survived, both prisoners and guards, became pirates in the nearby Strait of Malacca. Later they were suppressed by British troops in 1951 to deter the rise of more prisoners.

In 2002, Ko Tarutao was used as the filming location for Survivor: Thailand.

A 16 August 2013 Bangkok Post editorial said human trafficking gangsters "use the southern tip of the island to incarcerate and torture Muslim Rohingya boat people to extort ransom money before selling them into slavery".

See also 
 Tarutao National Marine Park

References

External links 

Islands of Thailand
Islands of the Strait of Malacca